Francesc-Xavier Ciuraneta-Aymí (12 March 1940 – 11 November 2020) was a Spanish Roman Catholic bishop.

Cuiraneta-Aymí was born in Spain and was ordained to the priesthood in 1964. He served as bishop of the Roman Catholic Diocese of Menorca, Spain, from 1991 to 1999 and as bishop of the Roman Catholic Diocese of Lleida, Spain, from 1999 to 2007.

Notes

1940 births
2020 deaths
People from Ribera d'Ebre
20th-century Roman Catholic bishops in Spain
21st-century Roman Catholic bishops in Spain